Ahuizotl Sánchez Talamantes (born September 16, 1962) is a Mexican football manager and former player.

References

External links

1962 births
Living people
Mexican footballers
Association football defenders
Mexican football managers
Leones Negros UdeG footballers
Atlético Morelia players
Footballers from Nayarit